Nazira is a town and a municipal board in India. It may also refer to:

 Nazira (name), list of people with the name
 Nazira Assembly constituency, assembly constituency in Assam, India